Sir John Dormer (18 October 1556 – 10 March 1626) was an English landowner and politician who sat in the House of Commons  in two periods between 1604 and 1622.

Biography 
Dormer was the son of William Dormer of Thame, Oxfordshire and grandson of Sir Michael Dormer who was Lord Mayor of London in 1541.  Sir John Dormer built a mansion at Dorton, Buckinghamshire and was High Sheriff of Buckinghamshire in 1597. He was knighted at Charterhouse on 11 May 1603.

In 1604, he was elected Member of Parliament for Clitheroe.  He was elected MP for  Aylesbury 1614 and again in 1621.

Dormer married Jane Giffard and had a son Robert, who became High Sheriff of Oxfordshire.

Dormer died in 1626 and was buried at Long Crendon north of Thame where there is an effigy.

References

1556 births
1626 deaths
English MPs 1604–1611
English MPs 1614
English MPs 1621–1622
High Sheriffs of Buckinghamshire